Lien Chen-ling (born January 31, 1988) is a Taiwanese judoka. She competed at the 2016 Summer Olympics in the women's 57 kg event, in which she lost the bronze medal match to Kaori Matsumoto. Judo World rank 7th in -57 kg in Female Seniors.

She also competed in the women's 57 kg event at the 2020 Summer Olympics held in Tokyo, Japan.

European Open Prague 2015 

Lien Chen-Ling won an IPPON in -57 kg at the European Open Prague 2015.

Grand Prix Budapest 2015 

Lien Chen-Ling won the gold medal via waza-ari in the Golden Score.

Bakus Grand Slam 2017 

Lien Chen-Ling got a Waza-ari by Ashi-waza at 3:16. After 4 minutes, opponent did not get any score from her, Lien Chen-Ling became the champion in -57 kg at Bakus Grand Slam 2017.

Marrakech Grand Prix 2019 

Go into the "Golden Score" after haven't get any score from both sides. In Golden Score, Lien Chen-Ling gets an IPPON via Osaekomi-waza. She won the gold medal in the -57 kg category at the Marrakech Grand Prix 2019.

References

External links
 

1988 births
Living people
Taiwanese female judoka
Olympic judoka of Taiwan
Judoka at the 2016 Summer Olympics
Judoka at the 2020 Summer Olympics
Judoka at the 2010 Asian Games
Judoka at the 2014 Asian Games
Judoka at the 2018 Asian Games
Asian Games medalists in judo
Asian Games bronze medalists for Chinese Taipei
Medalists at the 2010 Asian Games
Medalists at the 2018 Asian Games
20th-century Taiwanese women
21st-century Taiwanese women